is a railway station in Nakagawa-ku, Nagoya, Aichi Prefecture, Japan.

Line
Kintetsu Nagoya Line

Layout
The station has 2 side platforms serving a track each on the ground.

Ridership 
The number of passengers per day of the station is as follows.

 2015-11-10: 5364
 2012-11-13: 5271
 2010-11-9: 5236
 2008-11-18: 5415

Adjacent stations

Railway stations in Aichi Prefecture